Artjoms is a Latvian version of the common East European male given name Artyom or Artem, or Estonian Artjom

The name Artjoms became popular since 1985 and extremely popular among newborn boys since 2000 in Riga.

Notable people

Artjoms Osipovs, Latvian footballer, born in 1989
Artjoms Rudņevs, Latvian footballer, born in 1988

See also
Artem
Artyom
Artemy

References

Latvian masculine given names
Russian masculine given names
Ukrainian masculine given names
Armenian masculine given names
Belarusian masculine given names